Ben-Ryan Davies (born 30 December 1988) is an English actor who played Ronan Burley in Waterloo Road, Ryan in From There to Here and Nick Savage in Hollyoaks.

Career

He appeared in the CBBC show Jinx from October 2009 to January 2010. From September 2010, Davies appeared in Waterloo Road playing character Ronan Burley. His last episode was in 2012 in series 7, episode 20, and a guest appearance in episode 30. In 2014, he appeared in CBBC's Harriet's Army set during World War I where he plays Edward Grange, the elder brother of Harriet. He played the role of Michael Parry in the 2015 TV mini series, Black Work. In 2016, Davies joined the regular cast of Hollyoaks as Nick Savage. In 2017, he was nominated for a British Soap Award for that role. He left the show in June 2017 when his character was sentenced to prison.

Davies played the role of Prince Charming in Billingham Forum Theatre's 2017–2018 production of Cinderella.

In December 2018, he appeared in the Christmas episode of Casualty in the guest role of Laurie Gibbes.

He played the role of Peter Pan in the 2018/19 run of the pantomime at Billingham Forum.

Filmography

References

External links

1988 births
Living people
People from Rochdale
English male film actors
English male television actors
Male actors from Greater Manchester
21st-century English male actors